The Legend of Chasing Fish is a 2013 Chinese mythology fantasy romantic comedy television series directed Wu Jinyuan, Chen Guohua and Huang Jintianby, and starring Zhao Liying, Kenny Kwan, Shirley Dai and Ding Zijun. It was first broadcast on 13 July 2013 in Hunan Television in China. The story is based on Yulan Ji.

Plot
It tells the story of the Chinese benevolent fish yaoguai named Hongling. While on a mission to find the perfect birthday gift for the Azure Dragon Emperor, Hongling befriends youngster Zhang Zen. In an unexpected and heartbreaking twist of events, Zhang Zen's father is murdered, and Hongling fails to pass through the Dragon Gate, which will ascend her to a dragon. The Dragon Prince convinces the king to make an exception should she help Zhang Zen get married and bring back the wedding flower ball. Unfortunately, while troubles continue to appear on his path, Hongling finds herself falling for the youngster and sacrifices immortality for love, not knowing that troubles are still lurking in the corners and will take unimaginative measures to drive them apart.

Cast
 Zhao Liying as Hongling, a carp yaoguai.
 Kenny Kwan as Zhang Zhen, a scholar.
 Shirley Dai as Jin Mudan, a spoiled rich girl.
 Ding Zijun as Zhan Feng, the prince in the Song dynasty.
 Waise Lee as Jin Chong, the father of Jin Mudan, the prime minister of Song dynasty.
 Cao Xinyue as Tang Xin, a village girl who falls in love with the prince Zhan Feng.
 Bai Shan as Jin Ruolan, the sister of Jin Chong an Zhang Zhen's stepmother.
 Zhang Mingming as the dragon prince.

Other
 Lin Daxin as Bao Zheng, a powerful government officer.
 Wang Hui as Zhan Zhao.
 Huang Hai as Gongsun Ce.
 Feng Jin'gao as Emperor Renzong of Song.
 Qu Gao as Azure Dragon, king of the Eastern Ocean.
 Maggie Li as Guan Yin, goddess of mercy.
 Yang Mingna as Xiao Longnu, the dragon princess.

Production
This television series shot the scene in Hengdian World Studios, Zhejiang.

Critical response
It received positive reviews.

Its audience ratings are very high, and in box-office terms, it was a great success.

References

2013 Chinese television series debuts
2013 Chinese television series endings
Television series set in the Northern Song
Fictional depictions of Bao Zheng in television
Television shows set in Kaifeng
Hunan Television dramas
Chinese romantic comedy television series
Shenmo television series